Mylanchi Monchulla Veedu is a 2014 Malayalam family-drama film written by Udayakrishna-Siby K. Thomas, directed by Benny Thomas and produced by Haneef Mohammed under the banner of Red Rose Creations. It features actors Jayaram, Asif Ali, Siddique, Kanika and Madhu. The film received mixed reviews to good reviews from critics and audiences alike."

Plot
Sahib is head of an aristocratic Muslim Family. Kasim is his son. Vahida, Kasim's eldest daughter elopes with her lover Madhavan Kutty on the eve of her wedding. That leads to a lot of ruckus including killing of son of a Hindu leader due to mistaken identity by Kasim. Kasim goes to jail and released after seven years. On the way back he meets with an accident, due to which he became paralyzed.

Madhavan Kutty is a renowned Ayurveda physician. He comes to Kasim's treatment by feigning to be Muslim.

The rest of the film revolves around incidents that occur in the family after arrival of Madhavan Kutty for Kasim's treatment. The film ends on a happy note.

Cast 

 Jayaram as Dr. Madhavankutty / Dr.Mammootty
 Asif Ali as Anwar
 Siddique as Kasim, Soya Sahib's son
Madhu as Soya Sahib
 Sai Kumar as Narayanan Kurup
 Kanika as Wahida Madhavankutty, Kasim's elder daughter Madhavankutty's wife
 Meera Nandan as Shahina, Kasim's younger daughter and Anwar's fiancée, then wife
 Kalabhavan Shajon as Ismail
 Baburaj as Dr. Shajahan
 Kalabhavan Navas as Khadar / Vishnu Namboothiri
 Irshad as Ramesh kurup
 Kailash as Hasker	
 Babu Namboothiri as Krishnan Vaidyer, Madhavankutty's father
 Sasi Kalinga as Mullah
 Sunil Sukhada as Minister Ibrahim Sahib
 Chali Pala as Kurup's ally
 Jayakrishnan as police inspector
 Saju Kodiyan as Beerankutty

Soundtrack 

The tracks "Wahida" and "Thammil Thammil" were a success and received huge response through YouTube.

References

External links 
 
 Filmibeat.com

2014 films
2010s Malayalam-language films
Films scored by Afzal Yusuf